Jeffrey Sanchez (born October 18, 1985, in San Juan, Puerto Rico) is a jockey in American Thoroughbred horse racing best known for winning the 2010 Breeders' Cup Juvenile Fillies aboard Awesome Feather with whom he also swept the Florida Stallion Stakes at Calder Race Course. 

Sanchez raced in his native Puerto Rico before coming to the United States in 2005.

Year-end charts

References

1985 births
American jockeys
Puerto Rican jockeys
Sportspeople from San Juan, Puerto Rico
Living people